Eugene Luening (sometimes Eugen Luening) (1852–1944) was a Milwaukee born musician of German descent.

He was a conducting student of Richard Wagner and an important part of the Milwaukee music scene, which was heavily influenced by Germany at the time. He was president of the Milwaukee Music Society and acting head of the University of Wisconsin–Madison. His son Otto Luening was instrumental in the initial stages of electronic music composition.

1852 births
1944 deaths
American classical musicians
Classical musicians from Wisconsin
Musicians from Milwaukee